James Bond: The Spy Who Loved Me is a video game adaptation of the 1977 James Bond film The Spy Who Loved Me. The game was released for the Amiga, Atari ST, Amstrad CPC, Commodore 64, DOS computers, and ZX Spectrum in 1990.

The Spy Who Loved Me is a top-down shooter game in which the player navigates James Bond driving Wet Nellie, a modified Lotus Esprit. It features the characters from the film and some new characters.

Critical reception
The game received a good, but not excellent, reaction on the ZX Spectrum, with CRASH! giving it a 79% rating and saying "Good Mr. Bond, but not quite good enough to deserve an accolade", Sinclair User giving it 72% and saying "This one will leave you shaken but not stirred; A competent movie licence", and Your Sinclair rating it at 76%, saying "Half good/half bad Bond game. There's quite a lot here though, so it's not bad value." It was less well received on the Commodore 64, with Zzap!64 giving it a rating of 38%, describing it as "an uninspiring and unambitious conversion".

See also
 Outline of James Bond

References

External links
 
 MI6 :: James Bond 007 Video Games - The Spy Who Loved Me
 Movie Game Database - The Spy Who Loved Me

1990 video games
Amiga games
Amstrad CPC games
Atari ST games
Commodore 64 games
Domark games
DOS games
James Bond video games
ZX Spectrum games
Cold War video games
Video games developed in the United Kingdom